Azizabad (also Romanized as ‘Azīzābād) is a village in Khaveh-ye Shomali Rural District, in the Central District of Delfan County, Lorestan Province, Iran. At the 2006 census, its population was 140, in 34 families.

References 

Towns and villages in Delfan County